Sam De Koning (born 26 February 2001) is Australian rules footballer who plays for the Geelong Football Club in the Australian Football League. He made his debut in the round 5 of the 2021 AFL season between Geelong and North Melbourne at GMHBA Stadium.

Notably, De Koning’s first goal in AFL football was during the Geelong Cats, Sydney Swans 2022 Grand Final game.

Family life 
De Koning is one of ten children, with one of his elder brothers being  footballer Tom. His father Terry De Koning played for Footscray in the 1980s.

Statistics
Updated to the end of the 2022 season.

|-
| 2020 ||  || 16
| 0 || – || – || – || – || – || – || – || – || – || – || – || – || – || –
|-
| 2021 ||  || 16
| 1 || 0 || 2 || 7 || 1 || 8 || 3 || 0 || 0.0 || 2.0 || 7.0 || 1.0 || 8.0 || 3.0 || 0.0
|- 
| scope=row bgcolor=F0E68C | 2022# ||  || 16
| 23 || 1 || 0 || 143 || 138 || 281 || 120 || 6 || 0.0 || 0.0 || 6.2 || 6.0 || 12.2 || 5.2 || 0.3
|- class=sortbottom
! colspan=3 | Career
! 24 !! 1 !! 2 !! 150 !! 139 !! 289 !! 123 !! 6 !! 0.0 !! 0.1 !! 6.3 !! 5.8 !! 12.0 !! 5.1 !! 0.3
|}

Notes

Honours and achievements
Team
 AFL premiership player: 2022
 2× McClelland Trophy: 2022

Individual
 Geelong F.C. Best Young Player Award: 2022
 AFL Rising Star nominee: 2022 (round 11)

References

External links 

2001 births
Living people
Australian people of Dutch descent
Geelong Football Club players
Geelong Football Club Premiership players
Australian rules footballers from Victoria (Australia)
One-time VFL/AFL Premiership players